Paresh Ganatra (born 19 February 1965) is an Indian television, stage and film actor. He is known for his role as Praveen Thakkar in the Star Plus comedy series Baa Bahu Aur Baby (2005–2010), SAB TV's sitcom Chidiya Ghar and films like No Entry (2005), Rowdy Rathore (2012) amongst others.

Early life and education
Paresh Ganatra was born on 19 February 1965 in a Gujarati household in Mumbai, India, where was brought up. He did his schooling from Lions Juhu High School in 1981. Thereafter he graduated from Narsee Monjee College of Commerce and Economics in 1986, and joined Management studies at Somaiya College, Mumbai.

Career
Participating in theatre while in still college, he started his acting career with Gujarati theatre in the city from 1984 to 1992. He made his film debut with a role in Mann in 1999. He acted in TV series Ek Mahal Ho Sapnon Ka, a Colonial Cousins music video, TV commercials (including Symphony Air Coolers, Tata Phones, Coffee Bite, LG TV, Nerolac, Dabur and McDonald's), when he reached fame with the 2002 multi-star hit film Aankhen.

From then on, he has been active in Bollywood. He is known for his comic roles in comedic films, including No Entry, Welcome, Money Hai Toh Honey Hai and Delhi Belly amongst others. Rowdy Rathore, in which Paresh played a supporting role with Akshay Kumar, became a milestone for him as it succeeded at the box office. He worked in the comedy film, Bol Bachchan, starring Ajay Devgn, Abhishek Bachchan, Asin Thottumkal, Prachi Desai and directed by Rohit Shetty.

Filmography
 Mann (1999)
 Kai Zhala (2001)
 Aankhen (2002)
 No Entry (2005)
 Dil Diya Hai (2006)
 Welcome (2007)
 Money Hai Toh Honey Hai (2008)
 Khallballi: Fun Unlimited (2008)
 Khicdi: The Movie (2010)
 No Problem (2010)
 Delhi Belly (2011)
 Rowdy Rathore (2012)
 Main Krishna Hoon (2013)
 Shree (2013)
 Ramaiya Vastavaiya (2013)
 Shelter Skelter (2013)
 Freaky Ali (2016)
 Yamla Pagla Deewana Phir se (2018)
 Dabangg 3 (2019)

As a Producer
 Threesome (2018)

Television

Web

References

External links
 

Male actors in Hindi cinema
Indian male television actors
Indian male comedians
1973 births
Living people
Gujarati people
Male actors from Mumbai
University of Mumbai alumni
Indian male stage actors
Indian stand-up comedians
Indian male film actors
Indian male soap opera actors
20th-century Indian male actors
21st-century Indian male actors